Marvel's Spider-Man is an American animated television series based on the Spider-Man comics published by Marvel Comics. As of October 25, 2020, 58 episodes of Marvel’s Spider-Man have aired, concluding its third season, entitled Marvel's Spider-Man: Maximum Venom.

Series overview

Episodes

Origin shorts (2017)

Season 1 (2017–18)

Season 2 (2018–19)

Season 3: Maximum Venom (2020)
Note: Each episode in this season has a 44-minute runtime, twice as long as the previous seasons. However, the Marvel HQ YouTube channel presents these episodes available as standard 22-minute episodes, thus doubling the season's episode count from 6 to 12.

References

Lists of Marvel Comics animated series episodes
Lists of Spider-Man television series episodes
Lists of American children's animated television series episodes